Ray Barra (born January 3, 1930) is an American former ballet dancer, a ballet master and ballet director. He was a soloist with the American Ballet Theatre and a principal dancer of the Stuttgart Ballet, where he created parts in creations by John Cranko, including Romeo in Romeo and Juliet with Marcia Haydée as Julia. After retiring from the stage due to an injury, he worked as a ballet master with the Berlin State Ballet, the ballet of the Frankfurt Opera, the Hamburg Ballet and the Spanish National Dance Company.

Career 
Born Raymond Martin Barallobre Ramirez in San Francisco on January 3, 1930, and studied ballet at the School of Ballet in San Francisco and at the American Ballet Theatre School. In 1949 he became a member of the San Francisco Opera Ballet. From 1953 to 1959 he danced with American Ballet Theatre, already as a soloist. He was a principal dancer of the Stuttgart Ballet from 1959, where he performed classical parts such as the Prince in Swan Lake. He created roles in ballets  by John Cranko, the title role in Romeo and Juliet with Marcia Haydée as Julia (1962), the Prince in Firebird (1964), and the title role in Onegin (1965). He created major roles in ballets by Kenneth MacMillan, Pepe in Las Hermanas. (1963) and Song of the Earth (1965).

In 1966 Barra retired from the stage due to an injury. He worked as ballet master, from 1966 with the ballet of the Deutsche Oper Berlin, from 1970 with the ballet of the Frankfurt Opera, and from 1973 with the Hamburg Ballet of John Neumeier. In the late 1980s he was associate director and guest choreographer of the Ballet Nacional de España Clásico in Madrid.

Barra choreographed for the Ballet del Teatro Lírico Nacional La espera, also known as Antes del albor, on Miguel Ángel Roig-Francolí's Cinco piezas para orquesta (Five pieces for orchestra), first performed on 13 September 1987 at the Teatro de la Zarzuela in Madrid. He choreographed for the Washington Ballet Dumky Variations, on Dvorak's Piano Trio in E minor, Op. 90, played live. It was first performed on 13 February 1991.

Barra was ballet director in Berlin from 1994 to 1996. He has directed classical ballets for the Bavarian State Ballet, Don Quijote (1991), Swan Lake (1995) and Raymonda (2001).

References

External links 
 Ray Barra spainisculture.com
 Uraufführung des Balletts „Carmen“ von Ray Barra 16 November 2007
 History / The Cranko Era Stuttgart Ballet

American male ballet dancers
Living people
1930 births
Principal dancers
Ballet masters